Eritrea made its debut at the 2000 Summer Olympics in Sydney where it sent three athletes to compete in track and field events. At the 2004 Games in Athens, Zersenay Tadese won Eritrea's first ever medal when he finished third in the men's 10000 meters.

Eritrea made its winter debut at the 2018 Winter Olympics in PyeongChang, South Korea, where Shannon-Ogbnai Abeda competed for Eritrea in the alpine skiing events.

The Eritrean National Olympic Committee was formed in 1996 and recognized by the International Olympic Committee in 1999.

Medal tables

Medals by Summer Games

Medals by Winter Games

Medals by sport

List of medalists

See also
 List of flag bearers for Eritrea at the Olympics

External links

References